The NATO Training Mission-Afghanistan (NTM-A) activated the NATO Air Training Command-Afghanistan (NATC-A) in September 2010 while simultaneously deactivating its predecessor, the Coalition Air Power Transition Force (CAPTF). This reflected a change from a primarily US led and staffed mission to one that encompassed many other countries within the larger NATO training mission in Afghanistan.

NATC-A was replaced by the Train, Advise, Assist Command – Air, or TAAC-Air in January 2015 as the NATO campaign in Afghanistan transitioned to the Resolute Support Mission.

Mission
The NATC-A mission was to "set the conditions for a professional, fully independent and operationally capable Afghan 'air force' that meets the security requirements of Afghanistan today ... and tomorrow."  Since it has been established, NATC-A has worked to rebuild and modernize the Afghan Air Force and served as the air component of the US-led, international NATO Training Mission Afghanistan.

NATC-A worked to develop the Afghan Air Force (AAF) and the Afghan National Police (ANP) Air Interdiction Unit / Special Mission Wing to provide aviation support to the Government of the Islamic Republic of Afghanistan (GIROA). In turn, the AAF primarily supported the Afghan National Army while the ANP's Air Interdiction Unit supported counter-narcotics and logistics support missions.

Initially NATC-A worked on four lines of operation to build airmen, aircraft, facilities and the institution of the AAF. As the AAF matured, these effort evolved to strengthen the AAF institution, build AAF resource stewardship, forge a culture of safe standards, and advance AAF-led mission success.

Contributing Countries
NATO and non-NATO countries contributing personnel to NATC-A include Belgium, Canada, Croatia, Czech Republic, Denmark, El Salvador, Hungary, Italy, Latvia, Lithuania, Mongolia, Portugal, Ukraine, United Arab Emirates, United Kingdom and the United States.

Locations
Most of the NATC-A headquarters staff was co-located and daily worked with the AAF headquarters staff to train and advise them at Kabul International Airport. The remaining staff was located at Camp Eggers (in downtown Kabul) to facilitate coordination and AAF development with NTM-A and the Afghan Ministry of Defense. Since the United States originally contributed the most of the personnel and the NATC-A Commanding General was also dual-hatted as the 438th Air Expeditionary Wing Commander, NATC-A (and CAPTF) was organized along the US Air Force wing structure.

There are three subordinate groups, the 438th Air Expeditionary Advisory Group at Kabul International Airport; the 738th Air Expeditionary Advisory Group at Kandahar International Airfield; and 838th Air Expeditionary Advisory Group at Shindand Air Base. Additionally, there were smaller detachments throughout Afghanistan. These locations mirror the locations of three AAF wings (Kabul Air Wing, Kandahar Air Wing and Shindand Air Wing) and geographically separated AAF units NATC-A trained, advised and equipped.

Green On Blue Attacks
On April 27, 2011, nine NATC-A members were killed when one of the AAF members turned his weapon on the NATO advisors. They were Lt Col Frank Bryant, Maj Jeff Ausborn, Maj Dave Brodeur, Maj Phil Ambard, Maj Ray Estelle, Maj Charles Ransom, Capt Nate Nylander, MSgt Tara Jacobs Brown and LTC Jim McLaughlin (Ret). While it will never be fully understood why this attack occurred, this changed the dynamic of the advising mission. Since then, some NATO personnel fulfill the role of a "guardian angels" to watch over others as train and work with their Afghan counterparts and NATO rules of engagement have evolved to increase personnel security. Additionally, the Afghan Ministry of Defense instituted a more rigorous process of vetting AAF personnel including biometric testing and establishing "counter-infiltration" units to root out possible Taliban agents or sympathizers.

Significant Achievements

On November 28, 2012, the commanders of the Afghan Air Force and NATC-A signed a strategic flightplan.
.  The strategy prioritizes efforts along key transitional and operational goals: 
 · A strong, professional Afghan Air Force that successfully leads its missions and personnel
 · Effective AAF resource management and stewardship
 · A culture of safe and effective aviation, maintenance and support
 · Afghan planned, led, and coordinated operations

Future
The continuation and end of the NATC-A mission is dependent upon two conditions: the successful development of AAF capabilities and the approval of a defense and security agreement between GIROA and countries participating in the NATC-A mission.

References

NATO operations in Afghanistan